Julian Knoll (born 11 July 1999) is a German footballer who plays as a goalkeeper for VSG Altglienicke.

Career

Club career
Knoll first played for FSV 06 Ohratal before moving to FC Rot-Weiß Erfurt in 2012. From 2016 he played for U19s and trained for the first time with the clubs professional team.

On 22 January 2018 he made his debut for the first team in the 3. Liga in a 3-1 win against 1. FC Magdeburg due to a yellow card suspension for first choice goalkeeper Philipp Klewin. Although Klewin was ready for action again in the following game, Knoll was again given preference. However, he injured himself during the warm-up right before the game and was out for the rest of the season.

After Erfurt was relegated to the Regionalliga Nordost, Knoll signed a new professional contract with the club. With the withdrawal of the first team in January 2020, Knoll moved to NOFV-Oberliga Süd club Inter Leipzig. In the summer 2020, he joined VSG Altglienicke.

References

External links
 

1999 births
Living people
German footballers
Association football goalkeepers
FC Rot-Weiß Erfurt players
VSG Altglienicke players
Regionalliga players
3. Liga players
Inter Leipzig players